Pacific Access is a supply chain management and an engineering services company registered in Hong Kong, providing buying, production management, supply chain, trade management services and contract manufacturing. The company was incorporated in 1995 in Hong Kong and offers a multitude of products and production services. According to the company's website, www.pacific-access.com, they employ over 100 people and is the largest Turkish company in Asia. Pacific Access' main customers are Beko, Grundig, Arçelik, Migros Türk, Turk Traktor, Network and Aygaz providing supplier management, supply chain management and engineering services. One case study from its website http://www.pacific-access.com stated they successfully help launched Arcelik's robot mascot.

Pacific Access is one of China's largest exporters of high-quality consumer electrical appliances, managing over 7000 forty foot container in 2008.

Products
Pacific Access sells a range of electrical appliances and consumer electronics to distributors, wholesalers and importers. The range of appliances and consumer electronics include air-conditioners, heaters, small kitchen appliances, household appliances, wine coolers, MP3 players, digital photo frame and USB drives. Because of its diverse customers, Pacific Access also sells general merchandise products like ceramics household products, furniture, housewares and high quality pashminas.

Services
According to the website, Pacific Access has over 10 years experience specializing in developing high-quality plastic injection moulds and products. Offering a complete service from initial design to assembly. Their services include product development, engineering and manufacturing.

Business Model And Shipping Methods

Because of the volume Pacific Access buys products direct from the factory, they secure a good price all year round and then sells them to wholesalers, distributors and importers. Helping businesses source from China with peace of mind.

External links 
 Official website

References

Supply chain management
Service companies of Hong Kong